Poecilopeplus martialis is a species of beetle in the family Cerambycidae. It was described by Rosenberg in 1898.

References

Trachyderini
Beetles described in 1898